Bibile (also spelled:Bibila) is a town located in Monaragala District, Uva Province of Sri Lanka. Bibile's land is important to Sri Lankan agriculture. It was well known for oranges, though still oranges grown there the original variety 'Bibile Sweet is no longer in existence. Bibile was known as 'Sinhale' in Martin Wickremesinghe's novel "Gamperaliya".

The population is completely (100%) rural. There are 35208 people living in Bibile and the population density is about 74.4%. As per the official records majority of the population are Sinhalese. The population growth (1981–2001) has reached to 2.5%. The literacy rate is about 84.5% (as of 1999). However, there are about 65.4% does not attend school. Employment rate is about 90.9% (Over age 10).

The name of Bibile town is known to the world for many reasons. Name of Professor Senaka Bibile is one of them. His father was a native of Bibile.Dr. Wijya Jayathilake, currently the Executive Director of Transparency International Sri Lanka is also a native of Bibile area.

Bibile Madya Maha Vidayalaya (known as Wellassa National College) is one of the main schools in bibile. The first and only (as of 2011) Fulbright Scholar from Bibile; Mr. Nishantha Mallawaarachchi is an old boy of Wellassa National College.

Sweet Orange

A pest identified as Tristrasa is destroying orange cultivations in Bibile much to the anxiety of the residents of the area who depend on this main traditional crop that had been their main source of income for centuries. They said several other pests caused by viruses and fungus affected the orange cultivation after the heavy rains recently experienced in the area. Statistically more than 3000 acres of orange cultivation in the Moneragala district had been affected by pests. The farmers are alarmed that the orange cultivation in the district would be wiped out if the pest was not brought under control immediately. The cultivators who reap a bumper harvest in April and May every year are perturbed that the poor yield this year would result in heavy losses. Orange cultivation in Bibile and several other areas in the Moneragala district were affected by fungus and pests after the monsoonal rains.

Bibile Sweet, is the most popular variety unique to the area. However, it is a matter of concern that black spots caused by a fungus affected the fruits on the verge of harvest. Thousands of rotten oranges are found under the trees. The trees should be exposed to the sun to prevent the spread of the pest. Trees in shady gardens are more susceptible to the pest. The affected trees should be pruned and the rotten fruits destroyed. Pesticides should be applied when the trees are flowering to minimize the effect of the fungus,” Manager of the District Agrarian Training Centre, noted.

See also
List of towns in Uva

External links

Populated places in Uva Province